Hinn is a surname. Notable people with the surname include:

 Benny Hinn
 Christopher Hinn (1855-1926), American politician
 Michelle Hinn

Hinn can also refer to:

Hinn, legendary creature

See also
 Hin (disambiguation)